European Minigolf Sport Federation - EMF is the umbrella organisation of minigolf players throughout Europe, members are national minigolf federations.

Members

See also 
 Minigolf

References

External links 
 Official website

Miniature golf
Golf associations
Golf in Europe
European sports federations